Robyn Fralick is an American women's basketball coach who is the current head coach at Bowling Green.

Early life and education

Davidson statistics

Source

Coaching career

Ashland
At Ashland, Fralick was 104–3 overall as a head coach, winning the 2017 NCAA Division II National Championship and reaching the title game the following year, as well.

Bowling Green
On April 3, 2018, Fralick was named head coach of the Bowling Green Women's Basketball program.

After a slow first 2 years working to rebuild the Falcon program, Fralick led the Falcons to their first MAC Championship Game appearance since 2011, losing a hotly contested battle in Cleveland with Central Michigan, 77–72. For her efforts, Fralick was named the MAC Coach of the Year for the 2020–2021 season.

Personal life
Fralick is married to her husband Tim, they have a son, William, and a daughter, Clara. Her Husband Tim served as a volunteer assistant coach during her three years at Ashland.

Head coaching record

NCAA Division II

NCAA Division I

References

External links
Bowling Green Falcons coaching bio

Year of birth missing (living people)
Living people
Bowling Green Falcons women's basketball coaches
American women's basketball coaches
Ashland Eagles women's basketball coaches
Female sports coaches
Toledo Rockets women's basketball coaches
Western Michigan Broncos women's basketball coaches
Appalachian State Mountaineers women's basketball coaches
Davidson Wildcats women's basketball players
Basketball coaches from Michigan
Basketball players from Michigan
Sportspeople from Okemos, Michigan